Frank Uhlig (born 8 December 1955) is a German former footballer.

Club career 
He spent his entire senior career with FC Karl-Marx-Stadt in the DDR-Oberliga. The defender played more than 230 East German top-flight matches.

International career 
Uhlig won one cap for East Germany. He was part of the squad of the Olympic team that won the silver medal at the 1980 Summer Olympics.

References

External links
 
 
 

1955 births
Living people
German footballers
East German footballers
East Germany international footballers
Olympic footballers of East Germany
Olympic silver medalists for East Germany
Footballers at the 1980 Summer Olympics
Chemnitzer FC players
Olympic medalists in football
DDR-Oberliga players
Recipients of the Patriotic Order of Merit
Association football defenders
Medalists at the 1980 Summer Olympics
People from Zschopau
Footballers from Saxony